Oh Eun-jin (born February 26, 1993) is a South Korean curler from Jeonbuk. She won a gold medal at the 2014 Pacific-Asia Junior Curling Championships and a silver medal at the 2014 World Junior Curling Championships.

Career
Oh competed in four Pacific-Asia Junior Curling Championships during her junior career in 2010, 2011, 2013 and 2014. In 2010 and 2011, she won silver medals playing for the Kim Eun-jung rink. Her next two appearances were with Kim Kyeong-ae where they won bronze in 2013 and the gold medal in 2014. Her 2014 championship rink also represented South Korea at the 2014 World Junior Curling Championships where they won the silver medal after losing the final to Canada's Kelsey Rocque. She joined the Kim Su-ji rink at lead for the 2015–16 season and the team had a fifth-place finish at the 2016 Korean National Curling Championships. The next season, her rink played in four tour events and qualified for the playoffs at one, the 2016 Medicine Hat Charity Classic. Oh took over the team as skip for the 2017–18 season. Um Min-ji took over skipping Oh's rink for the 2020–21 season.

Teams

References

External links

Living people
South Korean female curlers
1993 births
Sportspeople from North Jeolla Province
21st-century South Korean women